The 1962 USAC Championship Car season consisted of 13 races, beginning in Trenton, New Jersey on April 8 and concluding in Phoenix, Arizona on November 18. There was also one non-championship event at Pikes Peak, Colorado.  The USAC National Champion and Indianapolis 500 winner was Rodger Ward.  Hugh Randall was killed in the first Langhorne 100 at Langhorne Speedway; he was 29 years old.

Schedule and results

- The Ted Horn Memorial was rained out, and a suitable alternative date was not found.

 No pole is awarded for the Pikes Peak Hill Climb, in this schedule on the pole is the driver who started first. No lap led was awarded for the Pikes Peak Hill Climb, however, a lap was awarded to the drivers that completed the climb.

Final points standings

References
 
 
 http://media.indycar.com/pdf/2011/IICS_2011_Historical_Record_Book_INT6.pdf  (p. 270-271)

See also
 1962 Indianapolis 500

USAC Championship Car season
USAC Championship Car
1962 in American motorsport